Dendryphantes holmi is a jumping spider species in the genus Dendryphantes that lives in Kenya. The species was first described in 2014.

References

Endemic fauna of Kenya
Spiders described in 2014
Spiders of Africa
Fauna of Kenya
Salticidae
Taxa named by Wanda Wesołowska